The Mighty and the Almighty: Reflections on America, God, and World Affairs is a 2006 memoir written by Madeleine Albright, former United States Secretary of State. 

The memoir expresses a view of God and religion as they relate to U.S. and global politics according to Albright's experience in public service. Particular issues addressed include Islamic fundamentalism and Evangelicalism and the role each played in the Bush White House, and discussion of Albright's childhood and her own personal traumas.

Plot
The book explores Albright's childhood as a Catholic, as converted to the Episcopal faith at the time of marriage, and late in life discovered her Jewish roots. In the book, it discussed the personal traumas that marked her life. However, the sudden departure of her husband of 23 years for another woman, the death of her  father, the stillbirth of a child, and the discovery by the media in the 1990s of the fact that three of her grandparents were Jewish and had died in Nazi camps.

Notes

External links
After Words interview with Albright on The Mighty and the Almighty, May 13, 2006

Books by Madeleine Albright
Books about diplomats
American memoirs
2006 non-fiction books
HarperCollins books
Books about religion